Lilla Turányi (born 20 December 1998) is a Hungarian footballer who plays as a defender for Bayer Leverkusen in the Frauen-Bundesliga and has appeared for the Hungary women's national team.

Career
Turányi has been capped for the Hungary national team, appearing for the team during the 2019 FIFA Women's World Cup qualifying cycle.

References

External links
 
 
 

1998 births
Living people
Hungarian women's footballers
Hungary women's international footballers
Women's association football defenders
MTK Hungária FC (women) players
Bayer 04 Leverkusen (women) players
Expatriate women's footballers in Germany
Hungarian expatriate sportspeople in Germany